Yamada Shinryukan was a semi-famous swordsman following the Edo period of the 17th century of Japan. Shinryukan was a noted teacher of the kusarigama (Which consists of a kama with a long chain with a weight at one end attached to it.) who killed many rival swordsmen. Shinryukan was finally defeated when he fought against the swordsman Araki Mataemon.

References

Secrets of the Samurai

Yamada Shinryukan